Corum may refer to:

People
 Gene Corum (1921-2010), American football coach
 James Corum, American military historian
 Lora L. Corum (1899-1949), American racecar driver

Places
 Çorum, city in Turkey; capital of Çorum Province
 Çorum Province, district in Turkey's Black Sea Region
 Corum, Acıpayam
 Corum (Montpellier), building in Montpellier, France
 Corum, Oklahoma, an unincorporated community in the American state.

Elements in works of English author Michael Moorcock
 Corum Jhaelen Irsei, protagonist in a series of books published between 1971 and 1974
 Corum, supplement to role-playing game Stormbringer, published in 2001 by Darcsyde Productions

Other uses
 Corum (watchmakers), Swiss watch manufacturing concern based in La Chaux-de-Fonds, Canton of Neuchâtel
 Corum II: Dark Lord, 1999 video game
 Corum Jhaelen Irsei, fictional character

See also
Coram (disambiguation)